Kerria may refer to:
 Kerria, a genus of flowering plants including only one species: Kerria japonica
 Kerria (insect), a genus of scale insects